Empress Pan (died February or March 252), personal name Pan Shu, was an empress of the state of Eastern Wu during the Three Kingdoms period of China. She was the only empress of Wu's founding emperor, Sun Quan, even though he had a succession of wives before her. She was the mother of Sun Liang, Sun Quan's successor and the second emperor of Wu.

Life
Lady Pan was from Gouzhang County (within present-day Ningbo) in Kuaiji Commandery. Her personal name was not recorded in her biography in the Records of the Three Kingdoms (Sanguozhi), the authoritative source of the history of the Three Kingdoms period. However, the Jiankang Shilu mentioned that her personal name was "Shu", hence she was also known as "Pan Shu". Her father, who served as a low-ranking official, was executed for committing an offence whose details are not recorded. Both Lady Pan and her elder sister were forced to become servants and assigned to the royal textile factory. Once, Sun Quan encountered her and felt that she was extraordinary so he took her as his concubine.

The historical treatise Shi Yi Ji mentioned that Lady Pan was known as the most beautiful woman in Jiangdong. When she was still working in the textile factory, she was alienated and called goddess by people who worked with her. After Sun Quan heard about this story, he ordered the painter to draw Lady Pan's portrait. Although Lady Pan looked glum in the portrait, Sun Quan was shocked because of her beauty and exclaimed:"She is a goddess,indeed. Her sadness is so attractive, let alone her smile." In the palace, Lady Pan was becoming increasingly favoured by Sun Quan so that he built a palace called Liuhuantai for her, which means "the palace of pomegranate and ring".

In 243, while Lady Pan was pregnant, she dreamt of receiving a dragon head and gave birth to Sun Liang later. In 250, in the aftermath of a succession struggle between Sun Quan's sons Sun He and Sun Ba, Sun Liang was designated as the crown prince by his father. In 251, Sun Quan instated Lady Pan as the empress. Empress Pan was known for being charming but jealous as she never ceased slandering and harming Sun Quan's other wives until her death.

Death
When Sun Quan became seriously ill in 252, Empress Pan asked Sun Hong, the Prefect of the Palace Writers, about how Empress Lü seized power after the death of her husband (Emperor Gao of the Han Dynasty). However, she herself also fell sick due to the stress of continuously attending to Sun Quan. She was ultimately murdered when she was in a coma, but how she was murdered remains a controversy. Wu officials claimed that her servants, unable to stand her temper, strangled her while she was asleep and claimed her death was of natural causes; while a number of historians, including Hu Sanxing, a commentator on Sima Guang's Zizhi Tongjian, believed that top Wu officials were complicit, as they feared that she would seize power as empress dowager after Sun Quan's death. Investigations into her death resulted in the execution of 6-7 people. Sun Quan died soon after in the same year. Empress Pan was buried together with Sun Quan at the Jiang Mausoleum (at the Purple Mountain, Nanjing, Jiangsu).

Family
In 250, Lady Pan requested Sun Quan to emancipate her elder sister from slavery and arrange a marriage for her sister and he agreed. Lady Pan's sister later married Tan Shao. When Sun Liang became the new emperor, he commissioned his uncle as a Cavalry Commandant. After Sun Liang was demoted to a prince under Sun Chen's persecution, Tan Shao lost his official position and was sent back to his home town of Luling with his family.

See also
 Eastern Wu family trees#Sun Quan
 Lists of people of the Three Kingdoms

References

 Chen, Shou (3rd century). Records of the Three Kingdoms (Sanguozhi).
 Hu, Sanxing (13th century). Annotations to the Zizhi Tongjian.
 Sima, Guang (1084). Zizhi Tongjian.
 Xu, Song ( 8th century). Jiankang Shilu.

|-

Year of birth unknown
252 deaths
Eastern Wu empresses
Murdered royalty
People from Ningbo
Assassinated Chinese people
Family of Sun Quan